The 2012–13 University of North Dakota men's basketball team represented the University of North Dakota during the 2012–13 NCAA Division I men's basketball season. They were led by seventh year head coach Brian Jones, played their home games at the Betty Engelstad Sioux Center and were first year members of the Big Sky Conference. They finished the season 16–17, 12–8 in Big Sky play to finish in third place. They advanced to the semifinals of the Big Sky tournament, where they lost to Weber State. They were invited to the 2013 CollegeInsider.com Postseason Tournament, their third straight CIT appearance, where they lost in the first round to Northern Iowa.

Roster

Schedule

|-
!colspan=9| Regular season

|-
!colspan=9| 2013 Big Sky Conference men's basketball tournament

|-
!colspan=9| 2013 CIT

References

North Dakota Fighting Hawks men's basketball seasons
North Dakota
North Dakota
Fight
Fight